The T-Mobile myTouch or myTouch series is a product line of private label smartphones manufactured by HTC, LG and Huawei sold and marketed in the United States by T-Mobile USA under the T-Mobile brand. Each phone in the series runs a version of the Android software stack.

The T-Mobile myTouch 3G is a version of the HTC Magic, but the T-Mobile myTouch 3G Slide and the T-Mobile myTouch 4G are both unique to T-Mobile USA.

The myTouch series has thus far included simultaneous marketing of slider-keyboarded and keyless versions of otherwise similarly equipped models.

Product models

See also

References

External links 
 T-Mobile USA myTouch official product page
 FCC Docs Confirm Rumors On T-Mobile’s Next myTouch.
 T-Mobile To Launch Huawei Made Prism On May 6th, HVGA Screen For The Win
 Regarding the Huawei 8730, see a Tmonew.com story regarding the FCC filing that lists the details on the specifications of the 8730.  Picture link here.

 
Android (operating system) devices
HTC mobile phones